Stella Tennant (17 December 1970 – 22 December 2020) was a British model and fashion designer, who rose to fame in the early 1990s and had a career that spanned almost 30 years. From an unconventional aristocratic family, she worked with Helmut Lang, Karl Lagerfeld, Marc Jacobs, Alexander McQueen, and Gianni Versace. She worked for haute couture names like Valentino, and Dior by John Galliano and with photographers Steven Meisel, Bruce Weber, Paolo Roversi, and Tim Walker. Over the years she appeared in advertising campaigns for Calvin Klein, Chanel, Hermès and Burberry.

Tennant won VH1/Vogue Model of the Year Award in 2001, Model of the Year at the 2011 British Fashion Awards and the Contribution to British Fashion award at the Harper's Bazaar Women of the Year 2016 awards; she was also inducted into the Scottish Fashion Awards Hall of Fame as Model of the Year in 2012. At the 2012 Olympic Games in London, she was one of the British supermodels, with models Naomi Campbell and Kate Moss, walking the runway in the closing ceremony.

In 2016, she co-designed a collection with Lady Isabel Cawdor for the Chanel owned London-based brand, Holland & Holland, she also ran Tennant & Son, a line of hand-knitted cashmeres and a luxury homewares company with her sister. For the last decade, she devoted most of her time looking after her four children and promoting sustainable causes.

She died suddenly on 22 December 2020 shortly after her 50th birthday. Her family announced the following month that she had died by suicide after being unwell for a prolonged period of time.

Early life and education
Stella Tennant was born on 17 December 1970 in London, England, the youngest of three children to the Hon. Tobias Tennant, son of the 2nd Baron Glenconner, and his wife, Lady Emma Cavendish.

She was the granddaughter of Andrew Cavendish, 11th Duke of Devonshire and his wife Deborah Mitford, the youngest of the Mitford sisters. Stella was the great niece of the flamboyant socialite Stephen Tennant, and was directly descended from Bess of Hardwick, a notable figure of Elizabethan English society, and a fourth cousin, once removed, to Diana, Princess of Wales.

Raised on a 1,500-acre (6 km2) sheep farm that her parents ran at Newcastleton, in the Scottish Borders, Tennant went to the local primary then attended St Leonards School in St Andrews followed by Marlborough College before completing a degree in sculpture at the Winchester School of Art.

Career

In 1993, Tennant sent photographs of herself to a high fashion magazine, and a friend introduced her to fashion writer Plum Sykes (Victoria Rowland). She had recently had her nasal septum pierced, which was an unusual look for models at the time.  Steven Meisel then used her on the cover of Italian Vogue. Soon after, Karl Lagerfeld announced Tennant as the new face of Chanel, with an exclusive contract. He is reported to have thought her reminiscent of Coco Chanel. She also modelled frequently for other influential fashion photographers of the 1990s, including Mario Testino, David Sims and Mark Borthwick. Priya Elan, writing in her Guardian obituary, credits her, together with Kate Moss and Erin O'Connor, with having "introduced an era of androgyny on the catwalk".

Tennant appeared on fashion catwalks for Shiatzy Chen, Bill Blass, Dior and Chanel. She was a muse of the designers Karl Lagerfeld, Gianni Versace, Alexander McQueen, Nicolas Ghesquière, Riccardo Tisci and Victoria Beckham. She also appeared in numerous other advertising campaigns, including Calvin Klein, Hermès, and in 2002 in an influential campaign for Burberry. In 2010, she starred in L.K.Bennett's Spring Summer campaign photographed by Tim Walker. During the Closing Ceremony of the 2012 London Olympics, Tennant, along with Naomi Campbell and Kate Moss, was one of the British models wearing fashions created by British designers specifically for the event.

In 2016, Tennant and Lady Isabella Cawdor premiered a new ready to wear collection they designed for the gunmaker and clothing retailer Holland & Holland. She continued to sculpt, and with her sister, a gilder, operated a luxury homewares company, Tennant & Tennant.

Personal life
Tennant married French photographer and osteopath David Lasnet in the village of Oxnam, Roxburghshire, on 22 June 1999. They had four children together. The family lived near Duns, in the small village of Edrom in Berwickshire, also in the Scottish Borders. In August 2020, Tennant and Lasnet announced they had separated.

Death
Tennant died on 22 December 2020, aged 50, in Duns, Scottish Borders, Scotland. According to her family, she died by suicide after struggling with her mental health.

Activism
In 2009, Tennant worked with green lifestyle organisation Global Cool to promote using less energy at home. She made a video and became one of the faces of its campaign titled Turn Up the Style, Turn Down the Heat. She also supported initiatives aimed at reducing fashion's effect on the environment, including Oxfam's "Second Hand September".

In August 2014, Tennant was one of 200 celebrities who signed a letter to The Guardian newspaper expressing their hope that Scotland would vote to remain part of the United Kingdom in September's referendum on that issue.

Honours and awards
In June 2012, Tennant was inducted as Model of the Year into the Scottish Fashion Awards Hall of Fame at its annual awards event.

References

External links

 
 Hello magazine profile
 

1970 births
2020 deaths
Scottish female models
Stella
British female models
People educated at St Leonards School
Alumni of the University of Southampton
Suicides in Scotland
2020 suicides
Female suicides